Luciano Varela (February 17, 1935 – September 2, 2017) was a Democratic member of the New Mexico House of Representatives, representing the 48th District from 1987 to 2016. Varela, who announced his retirement in 2015, sat as the deputy chair of the House Appropriations and Finance Committee as well as a member of the Health, Government and Indian Affairs Committee.

On February 12, 2016, during the legislative session, lawmakers from both sides of the aisle took time to honor the outgoing Varela, recognizing his years of service, knowledge of New Mexico and friendship.

Announcing his retirement in August 2015, Varela also endorsed his son, Jeff Varela, to succeed him. Questions about whether Jeff Varela actually lived in the district became an issue the primary campaign and he finished third of three candidates.

Personal life
Varela attended the College of Santa Fe where he received a degree in accounting. He was also an alumnus of La Salle University, where he received a law degree.

He worked in consulting, investments, and as a government official. Varela was also a member of the United States Army and United States Army Reserve.

Divorced with three children and nine grandchildren. Varela died on September 2, 2017 in Santa Fe, New Mexico.

References

External links
Project Vote Smart - Representative Lucky Varela (NM) profile

1935 births
2017 deaths
People from San Miguel County, New Mexico
La Salle University alumni
Hispanic and Latino American state legislators in New Mexico
Santa Fe University of Art and Design alumni
Democratic Party members of the New Mexico House of Representatives
21st-century American politicians